Baoan Coleman is a former American actor who had a supporting role in Rambo: First Blood Part II. He has also had smaller roles in other films including Rules of Engagement and was the voice of Mr. Hyunh in Nickelodeon's Hey Arnold! animated series. He is of Vietnamese heritage.

Filmography

References

External links

Living people
American male film actors
Place of birth missing (living people)
Year of birth missing (living people)
American male voice actors
20th-century American male actors
21st-century American male actors
American people of Vietnamese descent